The CERN Internet Exchange Point, or CIXP, is a historical European Internet landmark, through which the first pan-European Internet backbone and the first T1 connection to NSFnet were established in 1989 and 1990. CIXP is also member of the European Internet Exchange Association.

See also
 List of Internet exchange points

References

External links
 CIXP

CERN
Information technology organizations based in Europe
Internet exchange points in Switzerland